The Federación Argentina de Football (FAF) was a dissident football association of Argentina that organised its own championships from 1912 to 1914. The Argentine Football Association did not recognised those championships until both associations were merged in 1914. Currently, all the championships organised by the FAF are considered officials by the AFA.

History 

The breakup came after a conflict between the president of Gimnasia y Esgrima de Buenos Aires, Ricardo Aldao, and the Argentine Football Association. Several teams retired from the official body to form their own league, therefore the FAF was officially established on June 14, 1912.

Dissident clubs and founding members of FAF were Independiente, Porteño, Estudiantes (LP), Gimnasia y Esgrima (BA), Argentino de Quilmes, Atlanta, Kimberley (Villa Devoto) and Sociedad Sportiva Argentina. Independiente would be the first champion of the FAF in 1912.

The next year, Hispano Argentino and Tigre were added to the competition, increasing the number of teams to 10. By 1914, the number of teams decreased to eight. The body also organised a national cup, the Copa de Competencia La Nación, named after local newspaper La Nación that had donated the trophy.

After both associations, FAF and AFA were merged on December 23, 1914, there was a unique championship in 1915, with 25 teams taking part and four of them (Kimberley, Defensores de Belgrano, Comercio and Floresta) relegated at the end of the season.

Nevertheless, a new breakup would come in 1919 when another dissident body, the Asociación Amateurs de Football, was established.

Competitions 
The FAF organised several competitions, as listed below:

 Primera División (1912–14)
 División Intermedia (1912–14)
 Segunda División (1912–14)
 Tercera División (1912–14)
 Copa de Competencia La Nación (1913–14)

Champions

First Division

División Intermedia

Segunda División

Tercera División

Copa de Competencia La Nación

See also 
 Asociación Amateurs de Football 
 Liga Argentina de Football  
 Football in Argentina

Notes

References 

Football governing bodies in Argentina
F
Sports organizations established in 1912
Organizations disestablished in 1914
1912 establishments in Argentina
Defunct sports governing bodies in Argentina
Defunct association football governing bodies